Herbert Thompson (6 December 1869 – 22 October 1947) was an English first-class cricketer active 1894–1919 who played for Surrey. He was born in West Norwood; died in Caterham.

References

1869 births
1947 deaths
English cricketers
Surrey cricketers